Johnson Igwedibia popularly known as Don Waney was a Nigerian cultist who terrorised Rivers State. He was killed by a joint operation between the Nigerian Army and the State Security Service in 2018 in the border between Rivers state and Imo state.

References 

People executed for murder
Nigerian gangsters
Nigerian people convicted of murder
People convicted of murder by Nigeria
Executed Nigerian people
People from Rivers State
Executed gangsters